Anupama Parameswaran (born 18 February 1996) is an Indian actress who predominantly works in Telugu, Malayalam and Tamil films. She debuted with a supporting role in the Malayalam romance film Premam (2015), which became an industry hit. Her notable work includes in films such as A Aa (2016), Sathamanam Bhavati (2017), Hello Guru Prema Kosame (2018), Maniyarayile Ashokan (2020), Kurup (2021) and Karthikeya 2 (2022).

Early life and education 
Anupama was born on 18 February 1996 to malayali family in Irinjalakuda, Thrissur district, Kerala to Parameswaran Erekkath and Sunitha Parameswaran. She has a younger brother Akshay. She attended CMS College Kottayam, Kerala where she majored in Communicative English until she discontinued college to pursue acting.

Career 
Anupama debuted with Premam alongside Nivin Pauly, which was a commercial success. She then had a cameo in James & Alice, a Malayalam film. Later she forayed into Telugu films with a handful of projects including A Aa, where she played a lead role along with Nithiin and Samantha Ruth Prabhu. She then was in the Telugu remake of Premam. Her next film was Kodi, her debut in Tamil cinema, in which she had the lead role opposite Dhanush. She also acted alongside Sharwanand in the Telugu film Shatamanam Bhavati which was released in January 2017,  followed by Jomonte Suvisheshangal in Malayalam alongside Dulquer Salmaan released in the same month. After Vunnadhi Okate Zindagi opposite Ram Pothineni, she worked on Merlapaka Gandhi's Krishnarjuna Yudham opposite Nani and A. Karunakaran's Tej I Love You opposite Sai Dharam Tej. She was again paired alongside Ram Pothineni in Hello Guru Prema Kosame. In 2019, Anupama debuted with Natasaarvabhowma in Kannada cinema alongside Puneeth Rajkumar. She then appeared in Telugu film Rakshasudu. In 2021, she was paired opposite Atharvaa in Tamil film Thalli Pogathey. In 2022, she was paired opposite debutant Ashish in Telugu film Rowdy Boys. Her second Telugu film in the same year was in Karthikeya 2, which served as a sequel to Karthikeya (2014).

Filmography

Short films

Awards and nominations

References

External links 

 
 

Living people
Indian film actresses
Place of birth missing (living people)
Actresses from Thrissur
Actresses in Tamil cinema
Actresses in Telugu cinema
Actresses in Malayalam cinema
People from Irinjalakuda
21st-century Indian actresses
CMS College Kottayam alumni
Actresses in Kannada cinema
1996 births
Zee Cine Awards Telugu winners